Jill Anna Maria Johnson (born 24 May 1973) is a Swedish country and pop singer, songwriter and TV-host. She performed in the Melodifestivalen 1998 contest, winning with the song "Kärleken är" ("Love Is"), and represented Sweden at the Eurovision Song Contest 1998 with that song, which finished 10th with 53 points. In 2003 she entered Melodifestivalen for the second time with "Crazy in Love", which finished fourth in the final. She also hosted the final of Melodifestivalen 2005. Johnson is today one of the most successful artists in Sweden, with several Gold and Platinum records and since 2014 has hosted her own Swedish TV-show from Nashville, Jills veranda.

Biography

Johnson is from the small town of Ängelholm in the south western part of Sweden. By the age of four, she had decided she wanted to become an artist, an aspiration towards which she was highly encouraged by her local choir leader. As a 12-year-old, she started off as the vocalist in a Country & Western band, Tomboola Band, touring in Norway and Denmark. She signed eventually with EMI-Medley in Denmark and recorded an album, produced by producer Paul Bruun. The title-track, "Sugar Tree", became a hit in Denmark. In 1996, she had her first Swedish hit with "Kommer tid, kommer vår", a duet with Jan Johansen.

In 1998, she performed "Kärleken är" ("Love is") at national contest Melodifestivalen, winning the Swedish finals and going on to represent Sweden in the Eurovision Song Contest. The success was followed by the hit album När hela världen ser på and a successful tour.

In mid-1999, Johnson went to Los Angeles to look for material for her second album. At home, she worked with Andreas Carlsson (ASCAP Writer of the Year 2000), who is known for several hits, including Celine Dion's "That's the Way It Is". She also tried out a few local newcomers and the album Daughter of Eve was released in early 2000. It was very well received and Johnson was compared with some of the world's best artists.

In 2000, she received a Platinum-record in Denmark for the sound-track "Promise To Love" from the Danish block-buster, Eneste Ene. Later that year, Johnson started to collaborate with other songwriters such as Jenny Orenstein, Charlie Stefl, Mary Green [Biem Writer of the Year 2001]. This resulted in her receiving a publishing contract in Nashville, Tennessee. Consequently, in 2002 Johnson's album entitled Good Girl came to be with the help of producer Scott Baggett and some of Nashville's top musicians. This album secured Johnson's artistic sound and style and once again she was extremely well received by the press in their reviews where she was described as an artist of international calibre.

In the Swedish finals of the Eurovision Song Contest 2003 she qualified at fourth place (out of 32 entries) but and her song "Crazy in Love" became a hit and received a great deal of radio play and was followed by a successful tour.

Johnson's collective Discography CD was released in late March 2003. It contains the 20 most popular songs since her debut in 1995. The CD went straight into the sales charts for best selling CDs in Sweden. The single "Crazy in Love" stayed at No 1 in the Swedish Top Charts (Svensktoppen) 12 weeks consecutively and No 2 for 15 weeks. Discography sold Gold in Sweden and Johnson also got a Grammis for this album.

The album Roots and Wings was released in November 2003, recorded and produced by Amir Aly in Sweden and by Scott Baggett in Nashville, Tennessee. Roots and Wings sold Gold in less than two weeks and Platinum a few months later.

The album Being who you are was released in Sweden in late March 2005 and sold Gold in only a few weeks.

Johnson was the host of the 2005 Swedish finals of the Eurovision Song Contest in Stockholm. In 2014 she became the hostess of her own Swedish musical TV-series, Jills veranda, where she brought together and performed with different Swedish and American music personalities in Nashville, the city where she also spends much time working with her own music. In 2014, she was awarded with the Swedish Kristallen-prize for "Female host of the year", due to Jills veranda. The show aired two following seasons in 2015 and 2017. In 2016 she participated in the popular musical TV-series Så mycket bättre, which was broadcast on TV4.

In 2019, Jill released the single "Is It Hard Being A Man?" among others which topped the Swedish radio charts. The same year, Jill went on a club tour, "My Remedy Tour", which visited fifteen citites and premiered on the 8th of March in Malmö. On the 18th of August 2019, Jill hosted her own episode in the popular Swedish radio show Sommar i P1. 

Johnson will play the role as Camilla in the Swedish TV-series "Udda Veckor", which airs on Discovery+ during the spring of 2021. Jill's participation in the show marks her debut as an actress in a ficitv role.

Discography

Albums
Studio albums

Compilation albums

Christmas albums

Live albums

Extended plays

Singles

Notes

Music videos

References

External links

Official website

1973 births
Living people
People from Ängelholm Municipality
Eurovision Song Contest entrants for Sweden
Eurovision Song Contest entrants of 1998
Swedish country singers
Schlager musicians
21st-century Swedish singers
21st-century Swedish women singers
Melodifestivalen contestants of 2003
Melodifestivalen contestants of 1998